Qaraqan Sədi (also, Qarağan Sədi, Karagan Saadi, and Karagan-Sedi) is a village in the Agdash Rayon of Azerbaijan.  The village forms part of the municipality of Qaraqan Şıxlar.

References 

Populated places in Agdash District